Unmaiye Un Vilai Enna? is a 1976 Indian Tamil-language satirical film written and directed by Cho Ramaswamy. It is based on his stage play of the same name. Cho also stars, alongside R. Muthuraman, Padmapriya and S. A. Ashokan. The film revolves around a priest's efforts to save a young man from conviction for murder. It was released on 30 April 1976.

Plot 

A priest takes all possible steps to save a young man from conviction for a murder he committed to save a married woman from a womaniser. The priest stands up to his call as a minister of God and keeps to himself what the accused told him in private confession. He even hides that man from the police until he collects the necessary evidence to disclose the circumstances that led to the murder. He succeeds in his endeavour, risking his reputation, even his job and eventually his life.

Cast 
 R. Muthuraman as Arumainayagam
 Padmapriya as Rama
 S. A. Ashokan as Arokiasamy
 Cho Ramaswamy as Sathyanarayana
 Manorama as a journalist

Production 
Unmaiye Un Vilai Enna? was a popular play staged by Cho Ramaswamy through his Viveka Fine Arts Club. The play, which also starred Neelu, was critically acclaimed, and Cho adapted it into a film under the same name, serving as director, writer and even as actor. The film adaptation was produced by D.A.B. and Rana under Mohind Movies. Cinematography was handled by Sampath, and the editing by E. V. Shanmugham. The film was shot at Bangalore.

Themes 
According to the 1983 book Cinema as Medium of Communication in Tamil Nadu by C. R. W. David, the point of Unmaiye Un Vilai Enna? is to illustrate that "Movies have sharpened God-consciousness by emphasizing the neighbour-consciousness."

Soundtrack 
The soundtrack was composed by M. S. Viswanathan, with lyrics by Kannadasan.

Release and reception 
Unmaiye Un Vilai Enna? was released on 30 April 1976. Kanthan of Kalki lauded the film, particularly for Muthuraman's performance and Cho's writing.

References

Bibliography

External links 
 

1970s satirical films
1970s Tamil-language films
Films directed by Cho Ramaswamy
Films scored by M. S. Viswanathan
Indian films based on plays
Indian satirical films